The following outline is provided as an overview of and topical guide to Syria:

Syria – country in Western Asia, that borders Lebanon and the Mediterranean Sea to the west, Turkey to the north, Iraq to the east, Jordan to the south and Israel to the southwest. Civilization in Syria was one of the most ancient on earth. Syria is part of the Fertile Crescent, and from approximately 10,000 BCE it was one of the centers of Neolithic culture where agriculture and cattle breeding appeared for the first time in the world.  Over the millennia, Syria has been conquered and settled by many different peoples. A country of fertile plains, high mountains and deserts, it is home to diverse ethnic and religious groups, including Syriacs, Assyrians, Kurds, Circassians, Armenians, Druze, Alawite, Christians, Shias and Sunnis. The latter make up the majority of the population. Since March 2011, Syria has been embroiled in civil war in the wake of uprisings (considered an extension of the Arab Spring, the mass movement of revolutions and protests in the Arab world) against Assad and the neo-Ba'athist government. The opposition Syrian National Coalition selected Ghassan Hitto as prime minister of a rival provisional government on March 19, 2013, after being invited to do so by several foreign governments and the Arab League.

General reference 

 Pronunciation:
 Common English country name: Syria
 Official English country name:  The Syrian Arab Republic
 Common endonym(s): List of countries and capitals in native languages
 Official endonym(s): List of official endonyms of present-day nations and states
 Adjectival(s): Syrian
 Demonym(s):
 Etymology: Name of Syria
 International rankings of Syria
 ISO country codes:  SY, SYR, 760
 ISO region codes:  See ISO 3166-2:SY
 Internet country code top-level domain: .sy

Geography of Syria 

Geography of Syria
 Syria is: a country
 Location:
 Northern Hemisphere and Eastern Hemisphere
 Eurasia
 Asia
 Western Asia
 Southwest Asia
 Middle East
 Levant
 Time in Syria
 Time zone: UTC+02, summer UTC+03
 Extreme points of Syria
 High: Jabal el-Sheikh 
 Low: Mediterranean Sea 0 m
 Land boundaries:  2,253 km
 822 km
 605 km
 375 km
 375 km
 76 km
 Coastline: Mediterranean Sea 193 km
 Population of Syria: 19,929,000  - 54th most populous country

 Area of Syria: 185180 km2
 Atlas of Syria

Environment of Syria 

Environment of Syria
 Climate of Syria
 Environmental issues in Syria
 Geology of Syria
 Protected areas of Syria
 Biosphere reserves in Syria
 National parks of Syria
 Renewable energy in Syria
 Wildlife of Syria
 Fauna of Syria
 Birds of Syria
 Mammals of Syria

Natural geographic features of Syria 

 Glaciers of Syria
 Islands of Syria
 Lakes of Syria
 Mountains of Syria
 Volcanoes in Syria
 Rivers in Syria
 Waterfalls of Syria
 Valleys of Syria
 World Heritage Sites in Syria

Regions of Syria 

Regions of Syria

Ecoregions of Syria 

List of ecoregions in Syria
 Ecoregions in Syria

Administrative divisions of Syria 

Administrative divisions of Syria
 Governorates of Syria
 Districts of Syria
 Municipalities of Syria

Provinces of Syria 

Governorates of Syria
Al-Hasakah
Aleppo
Damascus
Daraa
Deir ez-Zor
Hama
Homs
Idlib
Latakia
Quneitra
Raqqa
Rif Dimashq
As-Suwayda
Tartus

Districts of Syria 

Districts of Syria
Al-Hasakah District
Al Qamishli District
Al-Malikiyah District
Ra's al-'Ayn District
'Ayn al-'Arab District
Afrin District
Al Bab District
As-Safirah District
A'zaz District
Jabal Sam'an
Jarabulus District
Manbij District
Raqqa District
Ath-Thawrah District
Tal Abyad District
As-Suwayda District
Salkhad District
Shahba District
As-Sanamayn District
Daraa District
Izra' District
Abu Kamal District
Mayadin District
Deir ez-Zor District
As-Suqaylabiyah District
Hama District
Masyaf District
Muhardeh District
Salamiyah District
Al-Mukharram District
Al-Qusayr District
Ar-Rastan District
Homs District
Palmyra District
Talkalakh District
Arihah District
Harem District
Idlib District
Jisr ash-Shugur District
Ma'arrat al-Numan District
Al-Haffah District
Jableh District
Latakia District
Qardaha District
Fiq District
Quneitra District
Al-Qutayfah District
An-Nabk District
Al-Tall District
Darayya District
Markaz Rif Dimashq
Duma District
Qatana District
Yabrud District
Zabadani District
Ash-Shaykh Badr District
Baniyas District
Duraykish District
Safita District
Tartus District

Municipalities of Syria 
 List of cities in Syria
 List of towns and villages in Syria

Demography of Syria 

Demographics of Syria

Government and politics of Syria 

Politics of Syria
 Form of government:
 Capital of Syria: Damascus
 Elections in Syria
 Political parties in Syria

Branches of the government of Syria 

Government of Syria

Executive branch of the government of Syria 
 Head of state: President of Syria, Bashar al-Assad; President of the Syrian National Coalition, Moaz al-Khatib
 List of presidents of Syria
 List of vice presidents of Syria
 Head of government: Prime Minister of Syria, Muhammad Naji al-Otari; Prime Minister of the Syrian National Coalition, Ghassan Hitto
 List of prime ministers of Syria
 Cabinet of Syria
 Government ministries of Syria

Legislative branch of the government of Syria 
 People's Council of Syria (Unicameral)
 List of speakers of the Parliament of Syria

Judicial branch of the government of Syria 

Court system of Syria
Judiciary of Syria
 High Judicial Council
 Court system of Syria
 Court of Cassation of Syria
 High Constitutional Court of Syria
 Civil and criminal courts of Syria
 Military courts of Syria
 Security courts of Syria
 Supreme Court of Syria

Foreign relations of Syria 

Foreign relations of Syria
 Arab League monitors in Syria
 Diplomatic missions in Syria
 List of Canadian ambassadors to Syria
 List of Ambassadors of the United Kingdom to Syria
 United Nations Supervision Mission in Syria
 United States Ambassador to Syria
 Diplomatic missions of Syria
 Permanent Representative of Syria to the United Nations

International organization membership 

International organization membership of Syria
The Syrian Arab Republic is a member of:

Arab Bank for Economic Development in Africa (ABEDA)
 Arab Federation for Engineering Industries (General Organization for Engineering Industries)
Arab Fund for Economic and Social Development (AFESD)
Arab Monetary Fund (AMF)
Council of Arab Economic Unity (CAEU)
Food and Agriculture Organization (FAO)
Group of 24 (G24)
Group of 77 (G77)
Interkosmos Spaceflight Program
International Atomic Energy Agency (IAEA)
International Bank for Reconstruction and Development (IBRD)
International Chamber of Commerce (ICC)
International Civil Aviation Organization (ICAO)
International Criminal Court (ICCt) (signatory)
International Criminal Police Organization (Interpol)
International Development Association (IDA)
International Federation of Red Cross and Red Crescent Societies (IFRCS)
International Finance Corporation (IFC)
International Fund for Agricultural Development (IFAD)
International Hydrographic Organization (IHO)
International Labour Organization (ILO)
International Maritime Organization (IMO)
International Monetary Fund (IMF)
International Olympic Committee (IOC)
International Organization for Standardization (ISO)

International Red Cross and Red Crescent Movement (ICRM)
International Telecommunication Union (ITU)
International Telecommunications Satellite Organization (ITSO)
Inter-Parliamentary Union (IPU)
Islamic Development Bank (IDB)
League of Arab States (LAS)
Multilateral Investment Guarantee Agency (MIGA)
Nonaligned Movement (NAM)
Organization of Arab Petroleum Exporting Countries (OAPEC)
Organisation of Islamic Cooperation (OIC)
United Nations (UN)
United Nations Conference on Trade and Development (UNCTAD)
United Nations Educational, Scientific, and Cultural Organization (UNESCO)
United Nations Industrial Development Organization (UNIDO)
United Nations Relief and Works Agency for Palestine Refugees in the Near East (UNRWA)
Universal Postal Union (UPU)
World Customs Organization (WCO)
World Federation of Trade Unions (WFTU)
World Health Organization (WHO)
World Intellectual Property Organization (WIPO)
World Meteorological Organization (WMO)
World Tourism Organization (UNWTO)

Syria is one of only 7 U.N. members which is not a member of the Organisation for the Prohibition of Chemical Weapons.

Law and order in Syria 

Law of Syria
 Constitution of Syria
 Crime in Syria
 Human trafficking in Syria
 Terrorism in Syria
 Human rights in Syria
 Freedom of religion in Syria
 Human rights violations during the Syrian civil war
 LGBT rights in Syria
Law enforcement in Syria
 Visa requirements for Syrian citizens

Military of Syria 

Military of Syria
 Command
 Commander-in-chief:
 Ministry of Defence of Syria
 Forces
 Army of Syria
 Navy of Syria
 Syrian Air Force
 List of Syrian Air Force bases
 List of Syrian Air Force squadrons
 Syrian Republican Guard
 Military history of Syria
 Military ranks of Syria

Local government in Syria 

Local government in Syria

History of Syria

History of Syria, by period 
 Syria during the Stone Age
 Levantine corridor – relatively narrow land route of migrations between the Mediterranean Sea to the northwest and deserts to the southeast that connects Africa into Eurasia. It is believed that early hominids spread from Africa to Asia and Europe via the Horn of Africa and the Levantine corridor (named after the Levant, which includes Syria).
 Cradle of civilization – term referring to locations identified as the sites of the emergence of civilization. In Western European and Middle Eastern cultures, it has frequently been applied to the Ancient Near Eastern Chalcolithic (Ubaid period, Naqada culture), especially in the Fertile Crescent (Levant and Mesopotamia).
 Mesopotamia – area of the Tigris–Euphrates river system, corresponding to modern-day Iraq, the northeastern section of Syria and to a lesser extent southeastern Turkey and smaller parts of southwestern Iran.  Widely considered to be the cradle of civilization in the West.
 Natufian culture – Epipaleolithic culture that existed from 13,000 to 9,800 years ago in the Levant. It was unusual in that it was sedentary, or semi-sedentary, before the introduction of agriculture.
 Tell Abu Hureyra – archaeological site located in the Euphrates valley in modern Syria. The remains of the villages within the tell come from over 4,000 years of habitation, spanning the Epipaleolithic and Neolithic periods.  The inhabitants of Abu Hureyra started out as hunter-gatherers but gradually transitioned to farming, making them the earliest known farmers in the world.
 Tell Aswad – large prehistoric, Neolithic Tell, about 5 hectares (540,000 sq ft) in size, located around 48 kilometres (30 mi) from Damascus in Syria. 
 Tell Ramad – prehistoric, Neolithic tell at the foot of Mount Hermon, about 20 kilometres (12 mi) southwest of Damascus in Syria. The tell was the site of a small village of 2 hectares (220,000 sq ft), which was first settled in the late eighth millennium BC.
 Halaf culture –
 Tell Halaf –
 Syria during the Bronze Age
 Canaanites –
 Amorites –
 Eblaites (Ebla city-state) –
 Ugarites –
 Akkadian Empire –
 Arameans – Northwest Semitic semi-nomadic and pastoralist people who originated in what is now modern Syria (Biblical Aram) during the Late Bronze Age and the Iron Age.
 Bronze Age collapse – sudden and culturally disruptive transition in the Aegean Region, Southwestern Asia and the Eastern Mediterranean from the Late Bronze Age to the Early Iron Age, during which the palace economy characterising the Late Bronze Age was replaced by the isolated village cultures of the Greek Dark Ages.  Prior to and during the Bronze Age Collapse, Syria became a battle ground between the empires of the Hittites, Assyrians, Mitanni and Egyptians, and the coastal regions came under attack from the Sea Peoples. From the 13th Century BCE the Arameans came to prominence in Syria, and the region outside of the Phoenician coastal areas eventually became Aramaic speaking.
 Syro-Hittite states –
 Phoenicia –
 Achaemenid Empire –
 Seleucid Empire –
 Roman–Syrian War –
 Syria (Roman province) –
 Syria Palaestina –
 List of Roman governors of Syria
 Palmyrene Empire
 Palmyra –
 Syria in the Middle Ages
 Byzantine Syria –
 Muslim conquest of the Levant –
 Rashidun Caliphate –
 Umayyad Caliphate –
 Bilad al-Sham –
 Great Seljuq Empire –
 Ayyubid dynasty
 Mongol invasions of Syria – starting in the 1240s, the Mongols made repeated invasions of Syria or attempts thereof. Most failed, but they did have some success in 1260 and 1300, capturing Aleppo and Damascus and destroying the Ayyubid dynasty.
 County of Edessa –
 Principality of Antioch –
 Ilkhanate –
 Mamluk Sultanate –
 Early modern period
 Ottoman Empire
 Ottoman Syria
 Timeline of Ottoman Syria history
 Modern history of Syria
 Kingdom of Syria (8 March–24 July 1920)
 State of Syria (1924–1930)
 Republic of Syria (1946-1963)
 Ba'athist Republic of Syria (1963-present)
 1963 Syrian coup d'état
 1966 Syrian coup d'état
 1970 Syrian Corrective Revolution
 Islamic uprising in Syria
 Hama massacre
 1999 Latakia protests
 Damascus Spring
 Ain es Saheb airstrike
 Syria Accountability Act
 2004 Al-Qamishli riots
 Damascus Declaration
 Operation Orchard
 2008 Abu Kamal raid
 Syrian civil war (15 March 2011 to present)
 Casualties of the Syrian civil war
 Cities and towns during the Syrian civil war
 Foreign involvement in the Syrian civil war
 Human rights violations during the Syrian civil war
 International demonstrations and protests relating to the Syrian civil war
 International reactions to the Syrian civil war
 List of articles related to the Syrian civil war
 List of bombings during the Syrian civil war
 List of bombings during the Syrian civil war
 List of heritage sites damaged during Syrian civil war
 List of journalists killed during the Syrian civil war
 Refugees of the Syrian civil war
 Russia's role in the Syrian civil war
 Sectarianism and minorities in the Syrian civil war
 Syrian civil war spillover in Lebanon
 Syrian media coverage of the Syrian civil war
 Syrian reactions to the Syrian civil war
 Timeline of the Syrian civil war
 Timeline of the Syrian civil war (January–April 2011)
 Timeline of the Syrian civil war (May–August 2011)
 Timeline of the Syrian civil war (September–December 2011)
 Timeline of the Syrian civil war (January–April 2012)
 Timeline of the Syrian civil war (May–August 2012)
 Timeline of the Syrian civil war (September–December 2012)
 Timeline of the Syrian civil war (from January 2013)

History of Syria, by region 
 History of the Middle East
 History of the Levant
 History of Syria
 History of Aleppo
 Ancient City of Aleppo
 List of rulers of Aleppo
 Timeline of Aleppo history
 History of Antioch – an ancient Syrian city, Antioch now lies within the borders of Turkey.
 Battles of Antioch
 Siege of Antioch
 Siege of Antioch (1268)
 History of Damascus
 List of rulers of Damascus
 Timeline of Damascus history
 History of Hama
 History of Homs
 First Battle of Homs
 Second Battle of Homs
 Siege of Homs

History of Syria, by subject 

 History of religion in Syria
 History of Eastern Christianity
 History of Syriac Christianity
 Islamization of Syria
 Military history of Syria
 1972 Israeli air raid in Syria and Lebanon
 List of massacres in Syria
 List of wars involving Syria
 List of Syrian flying aces
 Terrorism in Syria
 Mongol invasions of Syria

Culture of Syria 

Culture of Syria
 Architecture of Syria
 List of castles in Syria
 List of cathedrals in Syria
 Cuisine of Syria
 Beer in Syria
 Festivals in Syria
 Languages of Syria
 Media of Syria
 Museums in Syria
 National symbols of Syria
 Coat of arms of Syria
 Flag of Syria
 National anthem of Syria
 Prostitution in Syria
 Public holidays in Syria
 Records of Syria
 Smoking in Syria
 Scouting and Guiding in Syria
 Scouts of Syria
 World Heritage Sites in Syria

Art in Syria 
 Art in Syria
 List of Syrian artists
 Cinema of Syria
 List of Syrian films
 Literature of Syria
 Music of Syria
 Television in Syria
 Theatre in Syria

People of Syria 
People of Syria
 Armenians in Syria
 Assyrians in Syria
 Iraqis in Syria
 List of Syrian people
 List of Druze
 List of people from Damascus
 List of people from Homs
 List of people from Latakia
 List of Syrian Armenians
 List of Syrian artists
 List of Syrian defectors

Religion in Syria 
Religion in Syria
 List of monasteries in Syria
 Christianity in Syria
 Eastern Orthodoxy in Syria
 Roman Catholicism in Syria
 List of cathedrals in Syria
 Syriac Christianity
 Hinduism in Syria
 Islam in Syria
 List of mosques in Aleppo
 List of mosques in Damascus
 List of mosques in Syria
 Judaism in Syria
 Sikhism in Syria

Sports in Syria 

Sports in Syria
 Football in Syria
 List of football clubs in Syria
 List of football stadiums in Syria
 Syria national football team results
 Syria national football team results 2009
 Syria national football team results 2010
 Syrian Premier League top scorers
 Syria at the Olympics
 List of flag bearers for Syria at the Olympics
 Rugby union in Syria

Economy and infrastructure of Syria 

Economy of Syria
 Agriculture in Syria
 Forestry in Syria
 Banking in Syria
 Central Bank of Syria
 Commercial Bank of Syria
 Communications in Syria
 Telecommunications in Syria
List of Radio Towers in Syria
 Telephone numbers in Syria
 Television in Syria
 Internet in Syria
 Media in Syria
 List of radio stations in Syria
 Newspapers in Syria
 Companies of Syria
 Currency of Syria: Pound
ISO 4217: SYP
 Damascus Securities Exchange
 Economic rank, by nominal GDP (2007): 75th (seventy-fifth)
 Energy in Syria
 Energy policy of Syria
 Nuclear energy in Syria
 Power stations in Syria
 Oil industry in Syria
 Mining in Syria
 Tourism in Syria
 Transport in Syria
 Air transport in Syria
 Airlines of Syria
 Airports in Syria
 Rail transport in Syria
 Roads in Syria
 Vehicle registration plates of Syria
 Waste management in Syria
 Water supply and sanitation in Syria
 Water in Syria
 Water supply and sanitation in Syria
 Water resources management in Syria

Education in Syria 

Education in Syria
 Academic grading in Syria
 List of schools in Syria
 List of universities in Syria
 List of medical schools in Syria

Health in Syria 

Health in Syria
 List of medical schools in Syria
 Smoking in Syria

See also 

Syria
Index of Syria-related articles
List of international rankings
Member state of the United Nations
Outline of Asia
Outline of geography

 Greeks in Syria
 Kurds in Syria
 Cabinet of Syria (2001–2003)
 Cabinet of Syria (2003–2011)
 Embassy of Syria in Moscow
 Embassy of Syria, Berlin
 Embassy of Syria, London
 Embassy of Syria, Washington, D.C.
 2011 in Syria
 2013 Israeli Airstrike in Syria
 Ambassador of Syria to the United States
 Antiglobalization activists in Syria
 Armenian Evangelical Christian Endeavor Union of Syria and Lebanon
 Bank of Syria and Overseas
 Canadians of Syrian ancestry
 Center for Documentation of Violations in Syria
 Commercial Bank of Syria
 Domnina of Syria
 Entrepreneurship policies in Syria
 Friends of Syria Group
 General Union of Syrian Women
 Hama uprising in Syria
 History of Syria: including Lebanon and Palestine
 History of the Jews in Syria
 International rankings of Syria
 Internet censorship in Syria
 Islamic uprising in Syria
 Jobert of Syria
 King of Syria
 Kurdistan Democratic Party of Syria
 LGBT rights in Syria
 List of Lebanese in Syrian jails
 List of Seljuk rulers in Syria (1076–1117)
 List of Syriac Catholic Patriarchs of Antioch
 List of Syriac Orthodox Patriarchs of Antioch
 List of Syriac Patriarchs of Antioch from 512 to 1783
 List of Syriac writers
 Local Coordination Committees of Syria
 Macedonius of Syria
 Malchus of Syria
 Military ranks of Syria
 Movement for Justice and Development in Syria
 Muslim Brotherhood of Syria
 Names of Syriac Christians
 Nicanor of Syria
 Postage stamps and postal history of Syria
 Stratonice of Syria
 Thalassius and Limneus
 The Day After: Supporting a Democratic Transition in Syria

References

External links 

Search
Syria  Syrian search engine
 Etymology
Syria and Asyria Etymology 

 Government
Syrian Ministry of Foreign Affairs
E.sy, the First Complete Governmental Online Services
The Syrian Baath Party
Syrian Parliament
Syria:country study, Lib. of Congress

 Culture
The Syrian National Film Organization
Syrian General Organization of Radio and TV
Al Assad National Library
Pictures of Syria
Interactive Panoramas of Syria (QuickTime required)

 Society
syriapath  for Syrians and Syrian expats
Syria-Events  A website which keeps track of upcoming events and activities in Syria
A short video song about Syria and its main landmarks

 News
amude.net political news 
knntv.net political news 
esyria.sy the first complete Syrian portal
syria-news.com popular local news website
syriatodaynews.com news agency
sana.org SANA Syrian Arab News Agency, government news agency
rtv.gov.sy Syrian General Organization of Radio and TV
champress.net Cham Press, a complete roundup of news about Syria 

 Cities & Towns
Mashta Al Helou Official Website
Safita Official Website
alkafroun Official Website
Marmarita Official Website

 Travel
 

Syria
Outline